The 1999 Women's Hockey Champions Trophy was the 7th edition of the Hockey Champions Trophy for women. It was held between 10 and 19 June 1999 in Brisbane, Australia. It was held simultaneously with the men's tournament. This was the last biannual edition of the tournament until 2014 when it returned to its original format due to the introduction of the World League.

Australia won the tournament for the fifth consecutive time.

Teams
The participating teams were determined by International Hockey Federation (FIH):

 (Host nation, defending champions, champions of 1998 World Cup and 1996 Summer Olympics)
 (Second in 1998 World Cup)
 (Third in 1998 World Cup)
 (Fourth in 1998 World Cup)
 (Fifth in 1998 World Cup)
 (Sixth in 1998 World Cup)

Squads

Head Coach: Sergio Vigil

Mariela Antoniska (GK)
Agustina García
Magdalena Aicega
Silvia Corvalán
Anabel Gambero
Ayelén Stepnik
María de la Paz Hernández
Luciana Aymar
Alejandra Gulla
Jorgelina Rimoldi
Karina Masotta (c)
Mariana González Oliva
Paola Vukojicic (gk)
Mercedes Margalot
Natalia Morello
Cecilia Rognoni
Andrea Haines
Inés Arrondo

Head Coach: Ric Charlesworth

Head Coach: Berti Rauth

Head Coach: Kim Seon-dong

Park Yong-sook (GK)
Lee Jin-hee
Kim Mi-hyun
Yoo Hee-joo
Lee Mi-seong
Lee Sun-hwa
Kim Eun-jin
An Mi-Kyong
Shin Mi-kyung
Park Eun-kyung
Kim Seong-eun
Kim Soo-jung
Park Hyun-hee
Oh Soo-jin
Lee Eun-young (c)
Ko Soon-ja (GK)
Woo Hyun-jung
Cho Bo-ra

Head Coach: Tom van 't Hek

Clarinda Sinnige (GK)
Daphne Touw (GK)
Macha van der Vaart
Julie Deiters
Fatima Moreira de Melo
Karlijn Petri
Hanneke Smabers
Dillianne van den Boogaard
Margje Teeuwen
Mijntje Donners
Ageeth Boomgaardt
Myrna Veenstra
Minke Smabers
Carole Thate (c)
Fleur van de Kieft
Suzan van der Wielen
Eefke Mulder
Minke Booij

Head Coach: Jan Borren

Skippy McGregor
Moira Senior
Kylie Foy
Sandy Bennett
Toni Mason
Rachel Petrie
Anna Lawrence (c)
Robyn Matthews
Jenny Duck
Kate Trolove
Michelle Turner
Mandy Smith
Lisa Walton
Suzie Pearce
Anne-Marie Irving (GK)
Helen Clarke (GK)
Caryn Paewai
Diana Weavers

Results
All times are Eastern Standard Time (UTC+10:00)

Pool

Classification

Fifth and sixth place

Third and fourth place

Final

Statistics

Final standings

Goalscorers

References

External links
Official FIH website

1999
Champions Trophy
International women's field hockey competitions hosted by Australia
Champions Trophy
Sport in Brisbane
1990s in Brisbane
Hockey Champions Trophy Women